Negeri Sembilan Malay (also known as  or ) is an Austronesian language spoken mainly in the Malaysian state of Negeri Sembilan and in northern Malacca in Alor Gajah. The language is spoken by the descendants of Minangkabau settlers from Sumatra, who have migrated to Negeri Sembilan since as early as the 14th century. It is often considered a variant or dialect of the Minangkabau language; lexical and phonological studies, however, indicate that it is more closely related to Standard Malay than it is to Minangkabau.

History 
The Minangkabau people began migrating from the Sumatra highlands to the Malay Peninsula in the 14th century. Migration skyrocketed from the 15th century to the 16th century. At that time, trade activity through the Strait of Malacca increased and many migrants were granted protection by the Malacca Sultanate. From the ports of Malacca, groups and groups of Minangkabau settlers started venturing inland. This was the first migration wave of Minangkabau people to Malacca. Most of the Minangkabau migrants were from Luhak Tanah Datar and Luhak Limapuluh Kota. This first wave of migration resulted in the opening of a new mukim.

The number of inhabitants inland started increasing due to the rise of migrants and those migrants developed into their own groups of communities. These groups resulted in the creation of 12 clans as a whole. Different from in Sumatra, the naming of the clans were done based on the origin of the migrants. Migrants from Limapuluh Kota formed the clans:

 Payakumbuh (Payo Kumbuh/Payokumbuah)
 Batu Hampar
 Mungkal
 Seri Melenggang (Somolenggang/Simalanggang)
 Seri Lemak (Solomak/Sarilamak)
 Tiga Nenek (Tigo Nenek)
 Batu Belang (Batu Bolang)
 Tiga Batu (Tigo Batu/Tigo Batua Situjuah)

Meanwhile, the migrants from Tanah Datar formed the Tanah Datar clan. These migrants also formed three other clans which resulted from intermarriages with communities already settled where the aforementioned Tanah Datar migrants migrated to. These clans were:

 Anak Acheh (Anok Aceh)
 Anak Melaka (Anok Malako)
 Biduanda (Biduando/Dondo)

The Biduanda clan were seen as the leader of the clans that were present because they formed as a result of the intermingling between the Minangkabau people and the Orang Asli, the native people of the Malay Peninsula.

The opening of new mukims inland resulted in the formation of nine nagaris that composed of  that were governed by Undangs. The nagaris were:

 Jelebu
 Klang
 Johol
 Rembau
 Sungai Ujong
 Jelai
 Naning
 Segamat
 Pasir Besar

These nine nagaris later formed a federation that was called the Board of Negeri Sembilan. This federation was under the protection of the Johor Sultanate.

In the 18th century, the Johor Sultanate received several attacks and was in an unpeaceful state. During this period, Negeri Sembilan was under the Bugis, insofar as the Datuks of Negeri Sembilan cooperated to make a request to the Sultan of Johor (Abdul Jalil Shah IV) to invite a king from Pagaruyung to make him the leader, a request which was accepted. The invitation of the king (Raja Melewar) brought along the second migration wave of Minangkabau people and resulted in the formation of the state of Negeri Sembilan with the Yamtuan Besar as its leader and Adat Perpatih as its law.

The two migration waves of Minangkabau people and the assimilation of the Minangkabau language to the languages of the natives are what resulted in the language of Negeri Sembilan Malay. Negeri Sembilan Malay has been influenced by several languages such as Malaysian Malay, the standard Malaysian variety of Malay, English and Arabic, different from the Minangkabau language in Sumatra which has been influenced more by Indonesian, the Indonesian standardised form of Malay and Dutch. The Minangkabau people of Negeri Sembilan have been separated from the Minangkabau people of Sumatra for 500–600 years. This resulted in Negeri Sembilan Malay developing its own unique features.

Phonology

Comparison with Standard Malay

Vowels

Consonants

Vocabulary 
According to Reniwati (2012), Negeri Sembilan Malay has a lexical similarity of 94.74% with Standard Malay and a lexical similarity of 83.16% with Minangkabau.

References

Further reading

External links
 A list of terms in Negeri Sembilan's Malay dialect (Malay)

Languages of Malaysia
Malayic languages